The flag of the Marshall Islands, an island nation in the Pacific, was adopted upon the start of self-government, May 1, 1979. The flag was designed by Emlain Kabua, who served as the first First Lady of the republic.

Rules and specifications regarding the flag are set forth in the Official Flag of the Marshall Islands Act 1979 (Public Law 1979–1).

History
The Marshall Islands were part of the Trust Territory of the Pacific Islands administered by the United States, from which the Marshall Islands, Palau, and the Federated States of Micronesia split. In common with other island nations in the region, this flag features the symbolic representation of the islands' place within the ocean. The rising diagonal band represents the equator, the star above representing this Northern Hemisphere archipelago.  The white and orange portions of the band represent, respectively, the Ratak Chain ("sunrise") and the Ralik Chain ("sunset"), as well as symbolizing peace and courage.  The star's 24 points represent the number of electoral districts, while the four elongated points represent the principal cultural centers of Majuro, Jaluit, Wotje and Ebeye. The flag is also the national flag with the most points on a star, at 24.

Subnational flags

Specifications

The flag has a ratio of 10:19.  The star is situated such that its center is equidistant from the left edge, the top edge, and the top of the orange ray.

Colors

References

External links 
 

National flags
 
Flags introduced in 1979
Flags of indigenous peoples